Other Men's Daughters is a 1923 American silent drama film directed by Ben F. Wilson and starring Mabel Forrest, Bryant Washburn, Kathleen Kirkham, and Wheeler Oakman.

Plot
As described in a film magazine review, Dorothy Kane is severely disciplined by her stern father who, however, is very unconventional when he visits the city. The young woman revolts and leaves her country home. She meets the Alaska Kid, who introduces her to Lottie Bird, a fast living woman and a close acquaintance of Mr. Kane. Lottie plans a festive gathering, but when father and daughter meet unexpectedly in Lottie and the Kid's presence, he first raises a ruction about Dorothy for breaking into this lively society. Dorothy then counters sharply and strongly denounces her father for his cheating ways. She has fallen in love with the Alaska Kid and matters are patched up with her father's reformation.

Cast

References

Bibliography
 Connelly, Robert B. The Silents: Silent Feature Films, 1910-36, Volume 40, Issue 2. December Press, 1998.
 Munden, Kenneth White. The American Film Institute Catalog of Motion Pictures Produced in the United States, Part 1. University of California Press, 1997.

External links

 

1923 films
1923 drama films
1920s English-language films
American silent feature films
Silent American drama films
American black-and-white films
Films directed by Ben F. Wilson
1920s American films